In mathematical analysis, the Szegő limit theorems describe the asymptotic behaviour of the determinants of large Toeplitz matrices. They were first proved by Gábor Szegő.

Notation

Let  be a complex function ("symbol") on the unit circle. Consider the  Toeplitz matrices , defined by

where

First Szegő theorem
The first Szegő theorem states that, if 

Second Szegő theorem

References

Theorems in analysis
Matrices
Linear algebra